Thejus Engineering College is a private engineering college situated in Vellarakkad, Thrissur District of Kerala, India. Thejus Engineering College, a project of Cheruvathur Foundation was established in the year 2009. The College is affiliated to University of Calicut, approved by All India Council for Technical Education (AICTE) and sanctioned by Govt. of Kerala.

References

Engineering colleges in Thrissur district
All India Council for Technical Education
Colleges affiliated with the University of Calicut